Christmas on Death Row is a Christmas compilation album by  Death Row Records and Interscope Records on December 3, 1996. The album, Death Row's only Christmas-themed release, was made as a form of charity to the community.

Production was handled by Kevyn Lewis, Danny Boy, Sean "Barney" Thomas, Daz Dillinger, Operation From The Bottom, Reggie Lamb, Roman Johnson and Snoop Doggy Dogg, with Suge Knight serving as executive producer. It features contributions from Danny Boy, Guesss, Six Feet Deep, B.G.O.T.I., Nate Dogg, Tha Dogg Pound, 816, Bad Azz, Big Tray Deee, J-Flexx, Michel'le, O.F.T.B., Sean "Barney" Thomas and Snoop Dogg.

The album debuted at number 155 on the Billboard 200 and peaked at number 30 on the Top R&B/Hip-Hop Albums. A music video released for the single "Santa Claus Goes Straight to the Ghetto".

Track listing

Sample credits
Track 1 contains an interpolation of "Do Your Thing" written by Isaac Hayes
Track 16 contains a sample from "Christmas Everyday" as recorded by Smokey Robinson

Personnel

Calvin "Snoop Dogg" Broadus – performer & producer (track 1)
Delmar "Dat Nigga Daz" Arnaud – performer (tracks: 1, 3), producer (track 3)
Nathaniel "Nate Dogg" Hale – performer (tracks: 1, 8)
Tracy "Big Tray Deee" Davis – performer (track 1)
Jamarr "Bad Azz" Stamps – performer (track 1)
Daniel "Danny Boy" Steward – performer (tracks: 2, 5, 14), producer (tracks: 5, 14), co-producer (track 2)
Ricardo "Kurupt" Brown – performer (track 3)
Michel'le Toussant – performer (track 4)
Operation From The Bottom – performers & producers (track 6)
Six Feet Deep – performer (tracks: 7, 10, 15)
Don Guesss – performer (tracks: 7, 13, 16)
B.G.O.T.I. – performer (tracks: 7, 11)
816 – performers (track 8)
Sean "Barney Rubble" Thomas – performer (track 12), producer (tracks: 8, 12)
James "J-Flexx" Anderson – performer (track 12)
Kevyn "Cavi" Lewis – producer (tracks: 2, 4, 5, 7, 10, 11, 13-16), co-producer (tracks: 1, 3), arrangement (tracks: 1, 4, 7, 10, 15), mixing (tracks: 1, 2, 4, 5, 7, 13-16), engineering (tracks: 2, 7)
Roman Johnson – producer (track 2), arrangement (track 7)
Reggie Lamb – producer (track 4), arrangement (tracks: 4, 7, 15)
Dave Aron – mixing (tracks: 1, 2, 6, 8-10, 13, 16), engineering (tracks: 2, 3, 13, 16)
Rick Clifford – engineering  (tracks: 4, 5, 11, 14), mixing (tracks: 4, 5, 11, 12, 14)
Michael Geiser – engineering (tracks: 6, 8)
Lance Pierre – engineering (track 7)
Conley Abrams – mixing (track 7), engineering (track 15)
Matthew Quave – engineering (track 9, 13), mixing (track 13)
Travis Smith – engineering (track 12)
Marion Hugh "Suge" Knight Jr. – executive producer

Charts

References

External links

1996 Christmas albums
1996 compilation albums
G-funk compilation albums
Hip hop compilation albums
Christmas compilation albums
Gangsta rap compilation albums
Albums produced by Daz Dillinger
Christmas albums by American artists
Death Row Records compilation albums